"Devil Came to Me" is a song by Dover originally released as the opening track on the band's second studio album Devil Came to Me, which sold over 800,000 copies.

It was used in a compilation of songs from revealing bands of the moment, under the name of "GenerationNext Music by Pepsi".

Appearances
 A snippet of the song (specifically, the chorus "I lied for you, I lied for you") was included in a popular television commercial from Radical Fruit Company in 1997, which gave them great fame.
 The song appears in the 2001 Spanish film "No te fallaré".
 A remix of the song, "Devil Came to Me 07", was included in the album 2, released in November 2007.

References

Dover (band) songs
1997 songs
Subterfuge Records singles